Alessandro "Alex" Staropoli (born 9 January 1970) is a keyboard player, composer, leader and co-founder (with Luca Turilli) of the Italian symphonic power metal band Rhapsody of Fire. He does the orchestral arrangements in all the band's songs. Following the split with Turilli, Staropoli is Rhapsody of Fire's only remaining founding member.

Biography
Staropoli was born in Trieste. As a child he was mainly interested in nature – mountains, forests and lakes. At the age of nine he got his first piano and began to study its basics, and at the age of fourteen he bought his first electric guitar. After meeting Luca, but before the creation of Rhapsody of Fire, he bought a Korg 01/W pro keyboard, a model he still uses.

Alex and Luca met in 1990 during a course in mental techniques (how to have more control of your own mind), and together they started the band Rhapsody (later named as Rhapsody of Fire) in 1993.

References

External links
 Official Homepage
 Official Rhapsody Of Fire Website
  Interview with Alessandro Staropoli
Interview with Alex Staropoli

1970 births
Living people
Musicians from Trieste
Italian male composers
Heavy metal keyboardists
Italian keyboardists
Rhapsody of Fire members
Italian male pianists